Gore is an unincorporated community in western Frederick County, Virginia, United States, located off the Northwestern Turnpike on Gore Road (SR 751) west of Winchester. The community is nestled in the Back Creek valley. It has been called "Back Creek".

Gore serves as the western terminus of the Winchester and Western Railroad. It is home to the Gore plant of Unimin Corporation. Gore is the birthplace of the author Willa Cather.

Historic sites (listed on National Register of Historic Places) 
Sunrise (1815) 
Willa Cather Birthplace (Rachel E. Boak House) (1850)
Willow Shade (Willa Cather House) (1851)

References

Unincorporated communities in Frederick County, Virginia
Northwestern Turnpike
Unincorporated communities in Virginia